Menton (written Menton in classical norm or Mentan in Mistralian norm) is a commune in the Alpes-Maritimes department in the Provence-Alpes-Côte d'Azur region on the French Riviera, close to the Italian border. 

Menton has always been a frontier town. Since the end of the 14th century, it  was on the border between County of Nice, held by the Duke of Savoy, and Republic of Genoa. It was an exclave of the Principality of Monaco until the disputed French plebiscite of 1860, when it was added to France. It had been always a fashionable tourist centre with grand mansions and gardens. Its temperate Mediterranean climate is especially favourable to the citrus industry, with which it is strongly identified.

Etymology
Although the name's spelling and pronunciation in French are identical to those for the word that means "chin", there does not seem to be any link with this French word. According to the French geographer Ernest Nègre, the name Menton comes from the Roman name Mento. However, it is possible that the name of the city comes from Mons Ottonis (reconstituted) from the name of Otton II, the count of Ventimiglia from 1162-1200. In Mentonasc, the city's name is Mentan, and in Italian Mentone.

An inhabitant of Menton, un mentonnais or un mentonasque in French, would be O mentonasc in the local dialect.

History
The Menton area has been inhabited since the Paleolithic era, and is the site of the original "Grimaldi Man" find of early modern humans, as well as remains of Neanderthals and Cro-Magnons. In Roman times, the Via Julia Augusta, a road connecting Placentia (now Piacenza) with Arelates (now Arles) passed through Menton, running along  the Rue Longue in the old town.
The first major settlement occurred during the 11th century CE, when the count of Ventimiglia constructed the Château de Puypin (Podium Pinum) on the Pépin hill, north and west of the modern town centre. During the 13th century, the seigneury of Puypin fell to the Vento family of Genoa who built a new castle along the Roman road, now the site of the Vieux-Château cemetery, providing the core around which the current town grew. Menton was thus incorporated into the Republic of Genoa. The first mention of Menton dates from 21 July 1262, in the peace treaty between Charles of Anjou and Genoa. Its position on the border between the Angevin-ruled Provence and the Republic of Genoa, which at the time claimed Monaco as its western limit, made it a coveted location.

Acquired in 1346 by Charles Grimaldi, Lord of Monaco, Menton was ruled by the princes of Monaco until the French Revolution. Annexed during the Revolution, Menton remained part of France through the First Empire. It belonged to the district of Sanremo in the department of Alpes-Maritimes, which at the time included Monaco and Sanremo.

In 1814, Menton was included in a reconstituted principality of Monaco which, after Napoleon's Hundred Days in 1815, became a protectorate of the king of Sardinia. The princes of Monaco were obliged to do homage to the king for Menton, although not for Monaco itself.

In 1848, Menton, along with its neighbour Roquebrune, seceded from Monaco, due at least in part to a tax imposed on lemon exports. They proclaimed themselves a "free city" during the 1848 revolutions related to the Italian Risorgimento, then two years later placed themselves under the protection of the Kingdom of Sardinia where they were administered by the House of Savoy for ten years.

The Treaty of Turin concluded on 24 March 1860 between the Kingdom of Mauricio and Napoleon III's France called for the annexation of the County of Nice to France, subject to a plebiscite, as a reward for French assistance in Italy's war against Austria. The plebiscite, with universal adult male suffrage, was held on 15 and 16 April 1860, and resulted in an overwhelming vote in favour of annexation (833 for versus 54 against in Menton and Roquebrune), despite complaints of rigged elections from, among others, Nice-born Italian nationalist Giuseppe Garibaldi. The County of Nice was thus annexed to France that June, and Napoleon III paid 4 million francs in compensation to the prince of Monaco, who renounced his rights in perpetuity on 2 February 1861.

The publication of Winter and Spring on the Shores of the Mediterranean (1861) by the English doctor James Henry Bennett had a profound effect on Menton, making it a destination for sufferers of tuberculosis. By the end of the 19th century, tourism was an important factor in Menton's growth. The town was popular with British and Russian aristocrats who built many of the hotels, villas, and palaces which still grace Menton today. Many of these hotels and palaces were pressed into service as hospitals during World War I to allow injured troops to recuperate in a pleasant climate.

Menton was the only sizable settlement captured by Italy during its invasion of France in June 1940. Following the armistice of 22 June 1940, two-thirds of the territory of the commune was annexed by Italy as terra irredenta. The annexation lasted until 8 September 1943.

Although officially returned to Vichy France, Menton was in fact occupied by Nazi Germany until its liberation by American and Canadian troops of the First Special Service Force on 8 September 1944.

Geography

Menton, nicknamed the Pearl of France, is located on the Mediterranean Sea at the Franco-Italian border, just across from the Ligurian town of Ventimiglia. Menton station has rail connections to Paris, Marseille, Cannes, Antibes, Nice and Ventimiglia. The smaller Menton-Garavan station is situated between Menton and Ventimiglia.

The fishing industry was devastated in the 1980s and 1990s due to a combination of overfishing and hypoxia in the bay. At the time, the devastation was erroneously attributed to the dubiously nicknamed "killer algae" Caulerpa taxifolia (a non-native Asian tropical green alga first discovered in the Mediterranean Sea adjacent to the Oceanographic Museum of Monaco in 1984) spread throughout the coastal sea floor. Later, sound scientific findings revealed that the seaweed was adept at absorbing pollutants and excess nutrients, actually aiding the recovery of native Posidonia sea grass and enhancing local fish populations and overall biodiversity.

Climate

Menton has a very mild subtropical microclimate with an average of 316 clear or partially cloudy days annually. Under the Köppen system, Menton features a hot-summer mediterranean climate (Csa). However, the milder winters (on average) and the warmer nights in summer (on average), compared to the rest of the French Mediterranean coastal area, provide Menton with a particular micro-climate, with significant warm-summer mediterranean climate (Csb) influences and characteristics, like coastal Southern California (usually experienced between Nice through Monaco and Menton, toward the Italian border town of Ventimiglia and up to San Remo) that is favourable to hardy clementines, mandarin oranges, satsuma orange, tangerines, oranges and lemons (SRA 625 is protected Citron de Menton variety) groves, hence one of the town's symbols, the lemon. Winter frosts are extremely rare but may occasionally occur every few years at the ground level and snow falls on average once every 10 years. Likewise, summer temperatures are relatively moderate with day temperatures of 28-32, but rarely rising above 33 °C.

Townscape

Menton is known for its gardens, including the Jardin Serre de la Madone, the Jardin botanique exotique de Menton ('Le Val Rahmeh'), the Fontana Rosa, the Maria Serena garden, and the modernist gardens of Les Colombières. Le Val Rahmeh was established in 1905 by Englishman Sir Percy Radcliffe, the first owner of the gardens, and named for his wife. Villa Fontana Rosa was built in 1922 by Blasco Ibáñez, a Spanish novelist, and the gardens of the villa are now open to the public.

 The baroque basilica of Saint-Michel-Archange, with its belltower, was built in 1619 by the Genoese architect Lorenzo Lavagna.
 The Bastion Museum, which features decoration by Jean Cocteau, is located in the Bastion of the port of Menton. The bastion, built overwater in 1636 as an advance defense for the port  by the Princes of Monaco, is now located at the shoreline.
 The wedding room at the Mairie (town hall) was painted in the 1950s by Cocteau, transforming it into a giant work of art.
 Menton is home to at least half a dozen beaches.
 Menton is notable for its Palissy majolica pottery depicting lemons.

 The historic covered market was built in 1898 by local architect Adrien Rey. The market is open every day from 5 am until 1 pm in the summer; in the winter, it opens at 5:30 am. Over 30 kiosks both inside and around the market sell local and imported vegetables. The Belle Époque structure was one of buildings constructed by the architect in the region.
 Next to the beach and the covered market is the Jean Cocteau Museum. It opened in 2011 and is close to the Bastion Museum.
 Mirazur is a French haute cuisine restaurant with three Michelin Guide stars. The World's 50 Best Restaurants list ranks Mirazur as the best restaurant in the world.

Population

Education

Primary and secondary schools
Public nurseries/Preschools include:
 Centre-ville/Vieille ville area: Adrien Camaret and the Section enfantine de l'Hôtel de Ville
 Borrigo: René Cassin, Germaine Coty, Robert Debré, and Manon des Sources
 Careï: Careï and Saint-Exupéry
 Garavan: Section enfantine Alphonse Daudet

Public primary schools include:
 Centre-ville/Vieille ville area: élémentaire Frédéric Mistral and primaire de l'Hôtel de Ville
 Borrigo: élémentaire Anne Frank - André Guillevin, élémentaire Condamine Centenaire, and élementaire Marcel Pagnol
 Careï: élémentaire Careï Jeanne d'Arc and  élémentaire Saint-Exupéry
 Garavan: primaire Alphonse Daudet

There are two public junior high schools, Guillaume Vento and André Maurois. The two public sixth-form colleges/senior high schools are Lycée Pierre et Marie Curie and Lycée Professionnel Hôtelier Paul Valéry.

The private Institution Notre Dame du Sacré Cœur has the Villa Blanche preschool, primary, and junior high school in the Centre-ville area.

Colleges and universities
 The Institut d'Etudes politiques de Paris, the leading French university in social and political sciences, also known as Sciences Po, hosts a regional Middle East and Mediterranean campus in Menton since 2005.

Mentonasc language
The Mentonasc dialect is currently spoken by about 10% of the population in Menton, Roquebrune, and the surrounding villages. It is taught within the French educational system, as a variety of Niçard (i.e. Provençal and Occitan). However, in nineteenth-century linguistic descriptions, as well as in contemporary linguistic scholarship, Mentonasc is described as an intermediate between Niçard and the Intemelio dialect of Ligurian. Some scholars insist that Mentonasc is, at its base, a Ligurian dialect, with French influences coming only later,.

Annual town events
The Fête du Citron (Lemon Festival) takes place every February. The event follows a given theme each decade; past themes include Viva España, Disney, Neverland, and India. The carnival lasts a few days, with different bands passing through Menton's streets on foot or on truck trailers. The Casino Gardens in the centre of town are decorated in the theme of the festival, using lemons and oranges to cover the exhibits, and huge temporary statues are built and covered with citrus fruit.

The Casino Gardens are also the location for Menton's Christmas Festival.

The Menton Classical Musical Festival is also held every year in the centre of the old town.

Sport and recreation
Menton has a football team, Rapid de Menton, who play at the stadium Stade Lucien Rhein. Menton also has a rugby team, Le rugby Club Webb Ellis de Menton.

There is a municipal swimming pool, Piscine Alex Jany.

The town is famous in the cycling world as being the start of the climb of the Col de la Madone de Gorbio (generally shortened to Col de la Madone), which rises to 925 metres and was (in)famously used by Lance Armstrong to train for the Tour de France; many professionals based in neighbouring Monaco still use the climb for training and testing.

Menton was also the location of a international tennis tournament the Riviera Championships that ran from 1902 to 1976. It was hosted by the Menton Lawn Tennis Club. The event was part of the French Riviera circuit tour.

Notable residents

Notables who were born, lived, or died in Menton include:

Living people
 Jérôme Alonzo (born 1972), French first division football goalkeeper, born in Menton 
 Richard Anconina (born 1953), French actor; before his film career, he worked for several years at a holiday club for seniors in Menton
 Olivier Echouafni (born 1972), French first-division football midfielder, born in Menton
 Sébastien Gattuso (born 1971), Monégasque athlete specializing in bobsledding
 Cédric Varrault (born 1980), French first-division football defender; began his career with the Menton football club

Historical figures
 Émile Appay (1876–1935), French landscape painter, spent time in Menton over the years capturing paintings of the sea.
Ferdinand Bac (1859–1952), French illustrator, lithographer, and writer; developed the house and gardens of Les Colombières above Menton for Émile and Caroline Ladan-Bockairy. The house contains frescoes and modernist furniture by Bac, with a large garden set over several levels. Les Colombières is a Monument Historique and has been recently restored.
 Aubrey Vincent Beardsley (1872–1898), English illustrator and author
 Lesley Blanch (1904–2007), English-born writer
 Vicente Blasco Ibáñez (1867–1928), Spanish author; at the end of his life, lived on his estate, Fontana Rosa, in Menton
 Thomas Carlyle (1795–1881), Scottish essayist, historian and philosopher; lived at the home of Louisa Baring, Lady Ashburton from December 1866 to March 1867 following the death of his wife Jane Welsh Carlyle
 René Clément (1913–1996), film director
 Jean Cocteau (1889–1963), French artist, spent much time in Menton over the years; the Jean Cocteau Museum is in Menton; he decorated the wedding room in Menton's town hall, and the small stone bastion in Menton's harbour wall 
 Alfred Edersheim (1825–1889), Jewish Biblical scholar; died in Menton
 Ivan Grigorovich (1853–1930), Imperial Russian Navy admiral, lived in Menton after the Russian Revolution
 Panait Istrati (1884–1935), Romanian writer of French and Romanian expression (friends with Romain Rolland); lived in Menton for a brief period and has a street in Menton named after him
 Joseph Joffo (1931–2018), French author; lived temporarily in Menton during World War II
 Anatoly Lunacharsky (1875–1933), Russian Marxist revolutionary and the first Soviet People's Commissar of Enlightenment responsible for culture and education; died in Menton 
 George Macleay (1809–1891), Australian explorer and politician; died in Menton
 Katherine Mansfield (1888–1923), New Zealand modernist short story writer who lived and worked in a street now named after her. Her former home, the Villa Isola Bella is used as the residence for New Zealand writers who receive the Katherine Mansfield Menton Fellowship to live and write there for a year. 
 James Matheson (1796–1878), was a Scottish trader in India, co-founder of Jardine Matheson & Co., died in Menton 31 December 1878 (aged 82).
 Charles H. Spurgeon (1834–1892), British Baptist preacher; died in Menton
 Graham Sutherland (1903–1980), English painter
 Philip Meadows Taylor (1808–1876), British Indian civil servant and author
 Hans-Georg Tersling (1857–1920), Danish architect, designed many buildings in the town
 William Webb Ellis (1806–1872), inventor of rugby; lived in Menton at the end of his life and is buried in the old cemetery
 William Butler Yeats (1865–1939), Irish writer and poet; died in Menton

International relations

Menton is twinned with:

 Baden-Baden, Germany
 Laguna Beach, United States
 Montreux, Switzerland

 Nafplio, Greece
 Sochi, Russia

See also
 Knights of the Redeemer
 Mentonasc
 Roquebrune-Cap-Martin
 List of historical unrecognized states
 Former countries in Europe after 1815
 Intermelio
 Antoine Sartorio
 Communes of the Alpes-Maritimes department

References

External links

 Tourist office website
 Tourist office website (English version)
 City council website

 
Communes of Alpes-Maritimes
1848 establishments in Europe
1861 disestablishments in Europe
Former countries in Europe
Former republics
Former unrecognized countries
States and territories established in 1848
States and territories disestablished in 1861